Heidi CHU Hoi Ting (Traditional Chinese: 朱凱婷, born 17 August 1977) is the 2nd runner-up and winner of Miss International Goodwill of the 2001 Miss Hong Kong contest. She is currently a presenter/actress of TVB television company, which is also her management agent from 2005. She is also a guest host for MetroFinance radio station. In 2007, Heidi has been a Guest DJ at RTHKs (Radio 2 Channel) Morning Suite Program.

She also works as MC (Master of Ceremony) for various types of functions such as press conferences and promotion activities at shopping malls (which are good chance to meet her in real person). Graduated at the Chinese University of Hong Kong in 1999, with major in marketing, she also received a masters in corporate communication from The Chinese University. Heidi was a fine student, and always polite and professional in her studies and dealings with the university faculty and staff. Apart from her duties with TVB she has done a lot of MC work for Chinese University and many other clients. She has an excellent reputation among the faculty that knew her in the business school and the journalism faculty at CUHK. 

Heidi is the only daughter of the family.

References 

Alumni of the Chinese University of Hong Kong
1977 births
Living people
Hong Kong financial businesspeople